Cuniculus may mean:
 Cuniculus (water channel), diversionary water channels of Ancient Rome
 Cuniculus (genus), zoological genus of the pacas, three species of ground-dwelling, herbivorous rodents in South and Central America

See also
 Orthogeomys cuniculus